"This Woman" is a song written and recorded by American country music artist K. T. Oslin.  It was released in June 1989 as the fourth single and title track from the album This Woman.  The song reached #5 on the Billboard Hot Country Singles & Tracks chart.

Chart performance

Year-end charts

References

1989 singles
K. T. Oslin songs
Song recordings produced by Harold Shedd
RCA Records Nashville singles
Songs written by K. T. Oslin
1988 songs